Aeschremon disparalis is a species of moth in the family Crambidae. It is found in Greece, Iran, Uzbekistan, Turkey and Russia.

References

Moths described in 1851
Odontiini
Moths of Europe
Moths of Asia